The 2018 Reigate and Banstead Borough Council election took place on 3 May 2018 to elect members of Reigate and Banstead Borough Council in England. This was on the same day as other local elections. The Conservatives remained the largest party on the council while increasing their majority by 1, gaining a seat from both UKIP and the Liberal Democrats, while losing one seat to the Green Party.

Election result

Ward results

Banstead Village

Chipstead, Hooley and Woodmansterne

Earlswood and Whitebushes

Horley Central

Horley East

Horley West

Kingswood with Burgh Heath

Meadvale and St John's

Merstham

Nork

Redhill East

Redhill West

Reigate Central

Reigate Hill

South Park and Woodhatch

Tadworth and Walton

Tattenhams

References

Reigate and Banstead Borough Council elections
Reigate